The Chinese Taipei women's national futsal team is the official name given by FIFA to the women's national futsal team of Taiwan.

Tournament records
*Draws include knockout matches decided on penalty kicks.
**Gold background colour indicates that the tournament was won.
***Red border colour indicates tournament was held on home soil.

AMF World Cup

Asian Indoor and Martial Arts Games
 2005-2017 – Did not enter

AFC Women's Futsal Championship

Kits

Kit colours
Taiwan's traditional colors are blue and white:

Squad

2014~2016

2017 ~ 
The following players are called up for the 2018 AFC Championship preparation Camp.

Managers

See also 

 Chinese Taipei national futsal team
 Chinese Taipei women's national football team

References 
http://www.jfa.jp/national_team/news/00002962/

External links 
 Chinese Taipei Football Association official website 

Asian women's national futsal teams
futsal
Futsal in Taiwan